Monica Kristina Ingeborg Törnell (born 3 June 1954) is a Swedish singer and songwriter. After being discovered by Cornelis Vreeswijk 1971, she was a prominent singer in several genres, mainly folk and rock music, for over two decades. Together with Lasse Holm, she represented Sweden in the Eurovision Song Contest 1986 in Bergen, Norway. She is the mother of Tobias (born in 1973) and Mattias Törnell (born in 1980).

Biography

Childhood 
Monica Törnell lived her first years in Trönö (in the Norrala municipality), but she later moved with her family to Söderhamn.
In this city, she started to visit Folkets Park, where she heard artists such as Lill-Babs, Jerry Williams, and many others.
Early in her life, Törnell had her public debut before audience of 700 people at the 1962 Ericsson Christmas party in Söderhamn, where her father Jöns Törnell was an employee.
followed by a series of performances in public parks at home.
She was  also good at drawing, and in 1965, she became one of five first-prize winners in the drawing competition "Ung Fantasi" (Young Fantasy), in which 1500 schoolchildren took part.
In her early teens she played fiddle and sang both solo and in choir. In the late 1960s she was in the singing groups He, She and You and TJI. These groups consisted only of guitars and bass and sang mostly American folk music. On 20 February 1971, she won a vocalist contest in society Ljusne, Söderhamn Municipality, where she sang the song Summertime.

Discovery 
In 1971, Törnell sang at the opening of the local restaurant in Söderhamn that her father then opened along with a friend. At the same time, Cornelis Vreeswijk was across the street, which led to him discovering Törnell, although she was already relatively well known in the area. After meeting Vreeswijk, she quit as a photography student, which she had been for seven months after primary school. During the latter part of 1971 and beginning of 1972 she made a major tour in both Sweden and Denmark.
together with Vreeswijk. Other musicians on the tour were Björn J:son Lindh, Palle Danielsson, Kenny Håkansson, Björn Ståbi and Pers Hans Olsson.
Cornelis arranged a demo, which he presented to Göte Wilhelmson for his new record company Phonogram Records. She was offered a recording contract for a single, but turned it down because she wanted to do an LP album, which she did later in 1972. At the beginning of Törnell's time in the chaotic world of entertainment, Cornelis and his former wife Bim Warne gave her significant guidance. She also appeared on the television programmes Halvsju and Strapetz, and thus reached a wider audience.

Her real breakthrough came on 10 July 1972 at Visfestivalen in Västervik.
The same year she made her record debut with a folk music inspired LP, Ingica, which was issued by Phonogram with the label of Philips Records. Other musicians on the disk were Björn J:son Lindh, Janne Schaffer, and Vreeswijk himself. She also sang a duet with Cornelis in the song Jenny Jansson on his 1972 album Visor, svarta och röda, and a duet with Ola Magnell in the song, Man ska vara två from his first LP, Påtalåtar (published in 1974). She continued in the same style in their second LP, Alrik (1973), which was also a success. Both of her first albums were produced by Lill-Babs's brother Lasse Svensson, a former drummer in the bands Tages and Blond. That same year, she made a number of appearances with Tomas Ledin. She also sang the leitmotif to Per Oscarsson's controversial film Ebon Lundin (1973) along with Arne Olsson's big band Vieux Carré.

1975–79 
In the mid-1970s, Törnell oriented herself against rock, and toured for some time with her own band consisting of Henrik "Hempo" Hildén (from the jazz fusion group Splash) on drums, Per Sydén on bass guitar, and her brother, Bobo Törnell on guitar. In 1975 came the English-language album Don't Give a Damn, which was produced by Björn J:son Lindh. Several members of Splash were involved with the album. Bobo was involved with some of Monica's later albums, both as a guitarist and songwriter. The album was a kind of revolt against the image of her as folksinger. During the Progg movement, it was controversial for a Swedish artist to sing in English. She is often associated with this movement, but rarely sung in a progressive context, since she belonged to a commercial record company. However, she was critical of the movement, and said in 1977 that she hoped that Progg was the beginning of moving forward, instead of being simplistic, and music would be more open. The media compared her voice to that of Melanie Safka and Janis Joplin, but she said that the French Chanson had been her inspiration. In 1977, Törnell released another English-language album, Bush Lady, recorded in the UK and produced by the American jazz trumpeter Stephen Franckevich; however, this album was no more successful.

In October 1977, she participated in the feminist Kvinnokulturfestivalen at the Riksdag building in Stockholm, arranged by, among others, Suzanne Osten. She had more successes in 1978 when she returned to the Swedish language and, together with the group New Band (with several members of the band Östan Sol, Västan Måne) published the LPs Jag är som jag är... (I am who I am...), produced by Björn J: son Lindh. This album included the song En kungens man, written by Björn Afzelius in 1974 and the song Kavaljersvisa från Värmland, which became a huge success. The newspaper Dagens Nyheter awarded her with the Kasper Prize for this album, and in July of the same year she sang again at Visfestivalen in Västervik. Like a number of other artists, she supported option 3 of the :sv:Folkomröstningen om kärnkraften (Referendum on nuclear power) and participated in a 1979 compilation titled :sv:Nej till kärnkraft! (No to nuclear power!) with the song We Will All Go Together When We Go by Tom Lehrer. The same year, she also produced her own album, Ingica Mångrind, together with the New Band and mainly in English.

1980s 
In the early 1980s, Törnell returned to rock music and began to increasingly write her own songs. With the album Ängel (1982) began a long collaboration with the producer Ulf Wahlberg, who also played keyboard in the band Secret Service. The same year she also participated in a couple of songs on the album Z with, among others, Mats Zetterberg, known from the bands Fiendens musik and Bluesblocket from Lund in southern Sweden. In addition to the rock music she showed on a 1983 album with trumpeter Weine Renliden that she also has great potential as jazz vocalist.
 
In 1984 came Törnell LP Mica, which in addition to the hit song Vintersaga by Ted Ström, also included her own songs Heden and Känslan i maj, which was very successful (the latter came in 1989 also in the instrumental version of Putte Wickman and Ivan Renliden). She had then changed to the record company Air Music, led by Sture Borgedahl, and was in the mid-1980s along with Adolphson & Falk one of that company's most important artists. [12] She also participated in a couple of songs on Ströms own albums in the middle of the 1980s. In 1984 came a new album, Fri, including for example the title track Fri, written by Monica herself, and Nio liv. In 1985 she also sang the song Hav utan hamn of Lasse Wellander's album Full hand and a duet with Per Gessle in the song Rickie Lee on his solo album Scener. She also participated in the ANC Gala at Scandinavium in Gothenburg at the end of November the same year. [13]
 
In 1986 she made along with Lasse Holm song E' de' det här du kallar kärlek? (written by Holm), which became the winner of the Swedish Melodifestivalen and came in fifth place in the Eurovision Song Contest. To participate in this competition was not entirely uncontroversial, in view of her previous connection to the progg movement. She had, moreover, 1977 described Melodifestivalen as "this damned pop competition." [7] Holm had get into touch with Törnell when he 1985 was one of the producers of the album by Lasse Wellander as Törnell then participated in [2].
 
The same year also came album Big Mama, in which even Steve Marriott (from The Small Faces and Humble Pie) participated as guest artist. This album was produced by mainly Janne Schaffer and Törnell herself. She became involved in this time of Kjell Alinge's radio show Eldorado, with songs that I can see you by Don Henley and Mike Campbell with Swedish text by Peter R. Ericson (1987). The following year she sang three songs on a tribute album to Cornelis Vreeswijk, Den flygande holländaren, including her interpretation of Vreeswijk's song Ågren. She released two further own albums in the 1980s, now back with Ulf Wahlberg as producer, Månfred (1988), including the successful song Vind skall komma, and Vive la Mystique (1989). During the latter part of the 1980s, she made four appearances on Visfestivalen in Västervik, 1985, 1986, 1988 and 1989. From the mid-1980s, however, she had begun to have health problems, which later came to influence her career negative [14].

In recent years 
During the 1990s, became her state of health as well as her recordings and scene performances significantly fewer. From that time, she has mainly been active as a visual artist and has exhibited oil paintings, including in Söderhamn and Sundsvall. In 1992, however, she released a CD with songs by Lennart Hellsing. These were set to music by Klas Widén and Georg Riedel. The same year she also participated in an album with the band Twang from Gävle. She also made new appearances on Visfestivalen in Västervik 1991 and 1994. In 1997, she worked as an actor in the role of the woman weaver in Hans Klinga's stage-setting of Astrid Lindgren's Mio, My Son at the Royal Dramatic Theatre in Stockholm. [15] The following year she appeared in the television programme Livslust and told me about his illness and the diagnosis established only after ten years, chronic fatigue syndrome. [14] In October 1999 she sang again for the audience at a charity gala in Gävle Concert Hall. [16] The same year she also participated with the song Pilträd gråt för mig (Willow, Weep for Me, Ann Ronell-Fjellström / Bourne) on a tribute album to the then recently deceased guitarist Jan-Eric "Fjellis" Fjellström.

In 2001 she sang at the Cornelis Day on Mosebacke Etablissement in Stockholm along with jazz musician Thomas Jutterström from Söderhamn. [17] In 2004, she participated along with the British rock band Dr. Feelgood on the compilation album Rendezvous with I'm So Happy, a previously unreleased song that she herself wrote in the early 1980s. She has in recent years also made a number of appearances, including during the Söderhamn Days, along with the cover band Rocktools from Söderhamn. In January 2005 she sang at a charity gala for the victims of the 2004 Indian Ocean earthquake, which was held in Gävle Concert Hall. [18] The same year she sang duet with Thorsten Flinck in the song Här och nu (by Björn Afzelius) on the album Vildvuxna rosor. In 2007 she sang the song When I Paint My Masterpiece on the compilation album Whatever Colors You Have in Your Mind, a tribute to Bob Dylan. She has also (along with Björn Ståbi, Freddie Wadling, Karin Wistrand and others) participated in the music project Mother, which is led by the former punk rock musician Per Forsgren from Gävle and has resulted in the album LP (2008). Continuing health problems have, however, have so far been an obstacle for a comeback on a larger scale. [19]

Discography

Her albums
1972 - Ingica (Philips 6316 017)
1973 - Alrik (Philips 6316 033)
1975 - Don't Give a Damn (Philips 6316 052)
1977 - Bush Lady (Mercury 6363 011)
1978 - Jag är som jag är... (Philips 6316 108)
1979 - Ingica Mångrind (Philips 6316 123)
1982 - Ängel (6362 Mercury 088)
1984 - Mica (Air AIRLP 1013)
1984 - Fri (Air AIRLP 1015)
1986 - Big Mama (Air AIRLP 1019)
1986 - Förut ..., Monica Törnells bästa (selection from older albums, Air AIRLP 1021)
1988 - Månfred (RCA PD 71635)
1989 - Vive la Mystique (V.I.P. VCD 5001)
1992 - Äppelkväll, Monica Törnell sings Lennart Hellsing (Locomotion LOCO C-124)
1996 - Monica Törnell - svenska popfavoriter (selection from older albums, Karussell 552 566–2)

With the music project Mother 
2008 - LP (Mother Songs MOLP-1)

Participation in the compilation (selection) 
1977 - Sånger och musik från Kvinnokulturfestivalen (Silence SRS 4647)
1978 - VisFestivalen Västervik 1978 (Polydor 2379167)
1979 - Nej till kärnkraft! (MNW 99P)
1985 - VisFestivalen i Västervik 20 år (Sonet SLPD-2098)
1985 - ANC-galan. Svensk rock mot apartheid (Amalthea NLP 2001)
1987 - Eldorado. Äventyret fortsätter... (Sonet SLP 2788)
1988 - Den flygande holländaren (EMI 7910922)
1995 - På ruinens brant. 30 år med VisFestivalen i Västervik (Gazelle GAFCD-1003)
1999 - Fjellis - till och från en blå man (Playground PGMCD 3)
2004 - Rendezvous (Darrow BAM-334-21573)
2007 - Whatever Colors You Have in Your Mind - A Tribute to Bob Dylan (Darrow BAM-334-41873)

The involvement of other artists, albums 
1972 - Cornelis Vreeswijk: Visor, svarta och röda (Philips 6316 018)
1974 - Ola Magnell: Påtalåtar (Metronome MLP 15504)
1982 - Örjan Englund: Mamma, låt inte din grabb växa upp till cowboy (Election ELOLP 1101)
1982 - Zetterberg & Co.: "Z" (Tredje tåget TTLP 2)
1983 - Weine Renliden and His All Stars (Trumpet TLP 305)
1984 - Ted Ström: Ge mig mer (Sonet SLP-2753)
1985 - Per Gessle: Scener (EMI 1361911)
1985 - Lasse Wellander: Full Hand (CMM Records CMLP 102)
1986 - Ted Ström: Stråk (Frituna FRLP-218)
1987 - Björn Holm: Man överbord (EMI 1362591)
1989 - Putte Wickman & Ivan Renliden: Så skön som solen (only as a composer, AIRLP 1029)
1992 - Twang: Välkommen hit (Start Klart SKRCD-011)
2005 - Thorsten Flinck: Vildvuxna rosor (Bonnier Amigo Music BAM-334-22231)

Own singles 
1974 - Long Long Weekend / Give It Back (7", Philips 6015 107)
1975 - I'm in Love with a Big pig Frog / Sam Hill (7", Philips 6015 158, also released as promo, Phonogram 6015 158)
1977 - Katastrofen/ Snowcold Day (7", Mercury 6062 037)
1981 - En liten aning om helvetet / Ängel (7", Mercury 6016 053)
1984 - Vintersaga / Krig (7", AIRS 018)
1984 - Känslan i maj / Nu lever jag igen (7", AIRS 020)
1984 - Fri / Bidar min tid (7", AIRS 023)
1985 - Nio liv (club mix) / Nio liv (radio mix) / Nio liv (dubbmix) (12", AIRS 025 MAX)
1986 - Mellan raderna (Kom till mig) / Du måste så för att få skörd (7", AIRS 035)
1987 - Jag visste så väl / Ensam (7", RCA PB 60275)
1988 - Vind skall komma / En enda timma (7", RCA PB 60281)
1988 - På andra sidan midnatt / På kanten av ett stup (7", Bozz BOS 1016)
1989 - Vive la Mystique / Resan (7", V.I.P. VS 1002)
1990 - Någonting (get-down-mix, BPM 120) / Någonting (radio-version) / Kastar mina svärd (12", VIP VMX 1001)
1992 - Blå / Äppelkväll / Därför kan jag inte sova (promo-CD, Locomotion LOCO PRO-2)

Other singles 
1985 - Roger Rönning: Cecilia / På samma hotell (RAIRS 004)
1986 - Lasse Holm & Monica Törnell: E' de' det här du kallar kärlek / En kärleksmagi (Mariann MAS 2454)
1986 - Lasse Holm: Canelloni, Macaroni (Pizzeria Fantasia) / Another Kind of Loving (Mariann MAS 2456)
1986 - Lasse Holm & Monica Törnell: Another Kind of Loving / E' de' det här du kallar kärlek (West German pressing Hansa 108 249, Dutch pressing Dureco Benelux 5127)
1989 - After Ski: Låt oss bygga en bro / Hermann (with Susanne Alfvengren, Peter Lundblad, Lisa Nilsson, Tommy Nilsson, Mikael Rickfors, Anne-Lie Rydé, Björn Skifs, Jerry Williams, Monica Zetterlund and others, published in support for Stenmarkfonden (Swedish Ski), Bozz BOS 1047)
1992 - Twang: Här för dig / Jag har en vän (Start Klart SKRCDS-011)
1995 - Lasse Holm In Da Mix (promo, maxisingel, medley of songs by Lasse Holm, Columbia)

Sheet music 
1977 - En Alrik och sju andra visor [Alrik, Öje brudmarsch, Han gick på ängen, Suplåt, Jag går min väg, Näckens dotter, Morgonmarsch, Sam Hill] (Intersong-förlagen)
1984 - Mica (Air Music AIR 853)
1984 - Fri (Air Music AIR 923)
1986 - Big Mama (Air Music AIR 979)
1986 - E' de' det du kallar kärlek (Club Mariann Music)

Awards 
1978 - Dagens Nyheter's Kasper Prize
2003 - Ejnar Westling Award [20]

References 

Bonniers rocklexikon, Jan Sneum (huvudredaktör), Stockholm, Bonniers 2005, pp. 1258.
Myggans nöjeslexikon: ett uppslagsverk om underhållning, Uno "Myggan" Ericson (ed.), volume 14, Höganäs, Bra böcker, 1993, p. 93.
Lasse Mårtensgård: Söderhamn på 60-talet, Hudiksvall, Lars-Åke Winberg Förlags AB, 1994, .
Tobias Petterson: The Encyclopedia of Swedish Progressive Music, 1967–1979, Stockholm, Premium 2007, p. 181.
På ruinens brant. 30 år med VisFestivalen i Västervik, Hansi Schwarz and others (ed.) Värnamo, 1995, .
Album covers 1972–2008.

Footnotes

 Tomas Ledin., Accessed 2007-11-24 
 Björn Afzelius., Accessed 2007-11-24 
 Air Chrysalis Scandinavia., Accessed 2007-12-18 
 Mikael Wiehe., Accessed 2007-11-24 
 Karl-Erik Tallmo: När livet tog en annan väg. En sjukdomshistoria., Accessed 2007-11-24 
 "Monica Törnell gör comeback - på Dramaten", article by Annika Sundbaum-Melin, Aftonbladet, 1997-10-02, pp. 42 
 Sveriges inre., Accessed 2007-11-24 
 Cornelis Vreeswijksällskapet., Accessed 2007-11-24 
 De ställer upp för offren., Article by Johanna Jönsson, Gefle Dagblad, 2005-01-04, accessed 2007-11-24 
 Monica Törnell 50 år., TT-article by Monica Frima, Helsingborgs Dagblad 2004-06-01, accessed 2007-12-02 
 "Personnytt: SKAPs stipendier", article by Ove Säverman, Dagens Nyheter, 2003-05-22, p. B21

Living people
1954 births
People from Hälsingland
Swedish women singers
Eurovision Song Contest entrants for Sweden
Eurovision Song Contest entrants of 1986
People with chronic fatigue syndrome
Melodifestivalen contestants of 1986